Lock and Dam No. 10 is a lock and dam located in Guttenberg, Iowa on the Upper Mississippi River around river mile 615.0. It was constructed and placed in operation November 1937. The site underwent major rehabilitation 1989—2006. The lock and dam are owned and operated by the St. Paul District of the United States Army Corps of Engineers-Mississippi Valley Division.

The Friends of Pool 10 is a volunteer organization dedicated to the cleanup of the sloughs, backwaters and islands of the pool. Its first annual cleanup was in April 2007.

See also
Public Works Administration dams list
Upper Mississippi River National Wildlife and Fish Refuge

References

External links
U.S. Army Corps of Engineers, St. Paul District: Lock and Dam 10
U.S. Army Corps of Engineers, St. Paul District: Lock and Dam 10 brochure
USGS Reach 1, Pool 10
Civil works Digital project notebook

Dams in Iowa
Dams in Wisconsin
Historic American Engineering Record in Iowa
Historic American Engineering Record in Wisconsin
Mississippi River locks
United States Army Corps of Engineers dams
Transportation in Grant County, Wisconsin
Buildings and structures in Grant County, Wisconsin
Driftless Area
Transport infrastructure completed in 1937
Roller dams
Gravity dams
Dams on the Mississippi River
Mississippi Valley Division
Tourist attractions in Clayton County, Iowa
Guttenberg, Iowa
Transportation buildings and structures in Clayton County, Iowa
Locks of Iowa
Locks of Wisconsin
Public Works Administration in Iowa
Public Works Administration in Wisconsin
1937 establishments in Iowa
1937 establishments in Wisconsin